United States is a collaborative album between hard rock guitarist Paul Gilbert and singer Freddie Nelson.

Track listing
 "The Last Rock and Roll Star" – 4:05
 "Hideaway" – 4:41
 "Waste of Time" – 3:22
 "Bad Times Good" – 3:39
 "Paris Hilton Look-Alike" – 4:02
 "The Answer" – 3:03
 "I'm Free" – 4:19
 "Pulsar" – 4:27
 "Girl from Omaha" – 3:15
 "I'm Not Addicted" – 3:01

Personnel
 Paul Gilbert – guitar, bass, vocals
 Freddie Nelson – vocals, guitar
 Stephen Barber – string arrangements
 Stan Katayama – drum engineering, mixing
 Jun Murakawa – drum engineering
 Mark Chalecki – mastering

References

External links
 Interview with Freddie Nelson on Iron City Rocks

Paul Gilbert albums
2008 albums